This is a list of years in Liechtenstein. For only articles about years in Liechtenstein that have been written, see :Category:Years in Liechtenstein.

19th century 
Decades: 1860s ·
1870s ·
1880s ·
1890s

20th century 
Decades: 1900s ·
1910s ·
1920s ·
1930s ·
1940s ·
1950s ·
1960s ·
1970s ·
1980s ·
1990s

21st century

References  

 
History of Liechtenstein
Liechtenstein-related lists
Liechtenstein